Kübekháza is a settlement (village) in Csongrád-Csanád County, in Hungary. It is situated directly near the Romanian-Serbian-Hungarian triple border point, also known as the Triplex Confinium. A border crossing to Serbia opened in October 2019, ending the century of isolation of the neighbouring Serbian village Rabe.

Kübekháza was founded in 1844 by the settlement of tobacco farmers. A significant, 20% of the population was once German, many of which were deported after the Second World War. Even though the presence of Germans have decreased over the years (0,8% in 2020), this heritage is still honored by the village with street signs and boards displaying information in German aside from the default Hungarian.

The village was named after the Austrian statesman Karl Friedrich von Kübeck. Kübeck did not take direct action in the foundation of the settlement and likely never visited Kübekháza.

The settlement is sometimes called operetta-village because of the operetta-festival held with famous participants every summer.

References

Populated places in Csongrád-Csanád County